The Magic Place is the debut album by ambient artist, Julianna Barwick. The album was released on February 21, 2011 by Asthmatic Kitty Records.

Background
Barwick started working on her album in mid-2010 and in early 2011 the album was released by Asthmatic Kitty Records. The album contains elements of new-age and ambient music. 
Upon completion of the album, Barwick said:

Reception

The Magic Place received enthusiastic reviews from music critics. At Metacritic, which assigns a normalized rating out of 100 to reviews from mainstream critics, the album received an average score of 82, based on 18 reviews, indicating "universal acclaim". Luke Winkie of MusicOMH found that Barwick "is crafting gorgeously effecting sounds in a way that nobody has quite heard before, far beyond the snickering Enya comparisons or the reductive ties to Brian Eno's ambience... this isn't music for thinking or studying, this is just music for living". AllMusic writer K. Ross Hoffman wrote that "her sound has a comfortingly homespun, unfussy quality, and a patient, uplifting serenity, that remain uniquely her own". Mark Richardson of Pitchfork awarded the album the site's "Best New Music" designation and felt that it "stands above her earlier work in virtually every way".  Mojo praised it as "her most fully involved album, suffused with the warmth of fond memories and a deep, dream-like resonance", while Uncut wrote: "The sense of naive wonder evident recalls the bewitching power of Sigur Rós."

Arnold Pan of PopMatters wrote, "Try as you might to explain Julianna Barwick's incomparable, indescribable music, maybe it's best to let The Magic Place do all the talking, because the results speak for themselves". BBC Music was positive on the album and wrote: "The Magic Place, splendidly, isolates the listener, cuts them off from the world around them". In a mixed assessment, Slant Magazines Kevin Liedel instead found the album to be "a beautiful, ambiguous diversion better suited as a companion soundtrack to some experimental film or art installation than as the debut for a promising young singer".

Pitchfork placed the album at number 24 on its list of the top 50 albums of 2011. BBC Music ranked it at 19 of 25 in its own run down of the best albums of 2011.

In 2016, Pitchfork placed the album at number 30 on its list of the 50 best ambient albums of all time.

Track listing

Charts

References

2011 albums
Asthmatic Kitty albums
Julianna Barwick albums